Ghost Town Renegades is a 1947 American Western film directed by Ray Taylor and written by Patricia Harper. The film stars Lash LaRue, Al St. John, Jennifer Holt, Jack Ingram, Terry Frost and Steve Clark. The film was released on July 26, 1947, by Eagle-Lion Films.

Plot

Cast          
Lash LaRue as Marshal Cheyenne Davis
Al St. John as Fuzzy Q. Jones
Jennifer Holt as Diane Trent
Jack Ingram as Vance Sharp
Terry Frost as Flint
Steve Clark as Rodney Trent
Lee Roberts as Luther Johnson 
Lane Bradford as Waco
Henry Hall as Marshal Albert Jennings
William Fawcett as Jonas Watson
Dee Cooper as Henchman
Wally West as Henchman

References

External links
 

1947 films
American Western (genre) films
1947 Western (genre) films
Producers Releasing Corporation films
Eagle-Lion Films films
Films directed by Ray Taylor
American black-and-white films
1940s English-language films
1940s American films